Bedsole is a surname. Notable people with the surname include: 

Ann Bedsole (born 1930), American politician, businesswoman, community activist, and philanthropist
Hal Bedsole (1941–2017), American football player
Russell Bedsole, American politician and law enforcement officer

See also
McEntyre, Alabama, an unincorporated community also known as Bedsole

English-language surnames